According to the Book of Mormon, Lehi was a son of Helaman and was a Nephite missionary. He and his elder brother Nephi lived in the 1st century BC and had many missionary experiences together.  The main events of their missions are recorded in the fifth chapter of The Book of Helaman.  Lehi was named after his ancestor, Lehi, whose family immigrated to the New World from Jerusalem around 600 BC.  Helaman taught his two sons to keep the commandments and to walk uprightly before God, as their namesakes had done.

Known genealogy

Mission to the Nephites
Lehi's brother Nephi was the Chief Judge of the Nephites. After he resigned from the position, he joined Lehi in devoting the balance of their lives to the preaching of the Word of God.  Their first missionary efforts were among the Nephites, where they found success in prophesies and calling them to repentance, as they traveled to various Nephite cities.

The next phase of their labors took them to the Lamanites in the land of Zarahemla, where they also met Nephite dissenters who had joined the Lamanites.  As they taught with great power, many dissenters were confounded, humbled themselves, and eventually were baptized unto repentance.  These Nephites returned to their people to try to repair the wrongs which they had done.

Missions to the Lamanites
Lehi and Nephi then turned their attention to the Lamanites where the power and authority of their words came with great astonishment to the Lamanites, insomuch that 8,000 souls were convinced of the wickedness of the traditions of their fathers, and were baptized unto repentance.  
Lehi and Nephi then traveled to the land of Nephi where a Lamanite army captured and cast them into prison – the same prison that once held Ammon and his brethren.

Miracles at the Lamanite prison
After many days of imprisonment without food, the Lamanites came to slay them.  As they were approached, Lehi and Nephi were suddenly encircled about by a pillar of fire, which protected them from harm from their captors.  Their hearts did take courage by this miracle and emboldened them to testify of God’s power and spoke marvelous words.  As they did so, the earth and the walls of the prison shook exceedingly, a thick cloud of darkness and fear came over their captors, and a voice with perfect mildness call them to repentance.  The quake and the voice came a second and a third time, and spoke marvelous words that cannot be uttered by man.  The Lamanites were immovable because of the cloud of darkness which did overshadow them and the fear that it struck within them.  There was a dissenter among them, a Nephite by birth who belonged to the Church of God at one time, and whose name was Aminadab.  He told the Lamanites that he saw the faces of Lehi and Nephi, through the cloud of darkness; and their faces did shine exceedingly, even as the faces of angels; that they were conversing with angels, and that the Lamanites should repent.  They all had a change of heart and each one was encircled about with a pillar of fire.  The Holy Spirit came down and filled their hearts.  They heard the voice of the Father testify of His Well Beloved.  As they looked to see from whence the voice came, they saw the heavens open and angels came down and ministered unto them.  There were about three hundred souls who saw and heard these things.  These witnesses went forth in all the regions round about, ministering unto the people, and declaring what they saw and heard, insomuch that the majority of the Lamanites were convinced, laid down their weapons of war, and also their hatred.  They gave back to the Nephites the lands of their possession.

Second mission to the Nephites
Through these experiences, Lehi and Nephi became instrumental in causing the Lamanites to become more righteous than the Nephites, because of the peoples firmness and steadiness in the faith.  The two brothers, along with many converted Lamanites, came down to the land of Zarahemla and to the land North, which was called Mulek, to mingle in fellowship with the Church of God and to preach His Word, helping to cause great peace, prosperity, and joy among the Nephites.

See also
Book of Helaman
Helaman, son of Helaman
Aminadab

References

External links
 Book of Mormon Index entry on Lehi

Book of Mormon prophets
Angelic visionaries